Nadolany  (Nadoliany), supper oppido toto Nowothanecz et suburbis – 1446, Nowothanyecz cum supperiori suburbio - 1486, Wiesz Nadoliany – 1589, Nadolany – 1699, village in East Małopolska in the Lesser Beskid mountains, Bukowsko rural commune, parish in Nowotaniec.

Nadolany is about 10 miles from Sanok in south-west Poland. It is situated below the main watershed at the foot of the Słonne Mountain, and has an elevation of 340 metres. Situated in the Subcarpathian Voivodship (since 1999), previously in Krosno Voivodship (1975-1998) and Sanok district, (10 miles east of Sanok).

History

Nadolany was founded in 1446 by Bals family. From 966-1018, 1340-1772 (Ruthenian Voivodeship, Sanoker County) and during 1918-1939 Nadolany was part of Poland. While during 1772-1918 it belonged to Austrian empire, later Austrian-Hungarian empire when double monarchy was introduced in Austria.  This part of Poland was controlled by Austria for almost 120 years. At that time the area (including west and east of Subcarpathian Voivodship) was known as Galicia since 1772. In 1785 the village lands comprised 6 ½ lans.

Literature
 Adam Fastnacht, Nagórzany [in:] Slownik Historyczno-Geograficzny Ziemi Sanockiej w Średniowieczu (Historic-Geographic Dictionary of the Sanok District in the Middle Ages), Kraków, (II edition 2002), .
Jerzy Zuba "W Gminie Bukowsko". Roksana, 2004, . Translated by Deborah Greenlee. Arlington, TX 76016.

External links
Geographical Dictionary of the Kingdom of Poland and other Slavic Lands Słownik geograficzny Królestwa Polskiego i innych krajów słowiańskich. Warszawa. 1876. (digital edition)

Nadolany